Vlădești is a commune in Argeș County, Muntenia, Romania. It is composed of four villages: Coteasca, Drăghescu, Putina and Vlădești.

The Bratia River passes through Vlădești village.

Natives
Mihail Corbuleanu
Mircea Diaconu

References

Communes in Argeș County
Localities in Muntenia